The Borough of Fareham is a local government district with borough status and unparished area in Hampshire, England. Its council is based in Fareham. Other places within the borough include Portchester, Hill Head, Stubbington, Titchfield, Warsash, Locks Heath, Sarisbury and half of Whiteley. The borough covers much of the semi-urban area between the cities of Southampton and Portsmouth, and is part of the South Hampshire conurbation, with many residents commuting to the two cities for employment.

The Fareham urban district was reconstituted as a non-metropolitan district by the Local Government Act 1972 on 1 April 1974 and gained borough status.

The borough covers the area from Portchester in the east to Warsash in the west, south to Stubbington and Hill Head and north to include part of Whiteley. It is unusual for a relatively small borough in that it has two Members of Parliament (Stubbington and Hill Head are part of the Gosport constituency), two post towns (the west of the borough is in the Southampton post town) and three telephone dialling codes (mostly 01329, but 01489 in the west and 023 in the extreme east).

The 2001 Census found Fareham to have lower than average unemployment and crime with house prices higher than average. The population was estimated at 111,000 with an average age of 40.3 years.

Governance

The borough council is Conservative-controlled and has been since 1999. Following the elections on 3 May 2022 and Portchester East by-election, of the 31 Councillors, 26 are Conservative, 4 are Liberal Democrat and 1 is an independent, representing 15 wards.  The mayor, currently Councillor Mike Ford, is elected each year by his or her fellow councillors and is the civic head of the borough.  There is also a deputy mayor, currently Councillor Fred Birkett.

Wards
Fareham East
Fareham North
Fareham North-West
Fareham South
Fareham West
Hill Head
Locks Heath
Park Gate
Portchester East
Portchester West
Sarisbury
Stubbington
Titchfield
Titchfield Common
Warsash

Councillors

Boundaries
The boundaries date from 1932 when the parishes of Crofton, Hook with Warsash, Portchester, Sarisbury and Titchfield, all part of the Fareham Rural District, were added to Fareham Urban District.

The western boundary, with the borough of Eastleigh, is the River Hamble. To the north is the city of Winchester; to the east the City of Portsmouth, a unitary authority; and to the south the borough of Gosport. The south west and south east edges of the borough are both part of the coastline bordering the Solent.

Freedom of the Borough
The following people and military units have received the Freedom of the Borough of Fareham.

Military Units
 , RN: 2 July 1974.

See also
List of places of worship in the Borough of Fareham

References

External links
 Fareham Borough Council

 
Non-metropolitan districts of Hampshire
Unparished areas in Hampshire
Boroughs in England